Garmin–Cervélo was an elite professional women's cycling team registered in Great Britain and racing on the UCI Women's Road World Cup circuit. The team was previously known was Cervélo-Lifeforce Pro Cycling Team, but in 2009, with the creation of the UCI Professional Continental team , the women's team changed names to match the men's team. In 2007, the team was known as Raleigh-Lifeforce-Creation and prior to 2007, the team was known as the Univega Pro Cycling Team.

The Garmin–Cervélo women's team disbanded at the end of 2011 due to funding problems. Six of its ten riders, including all four Britons, transferred to the AA Drink–leontien.nl team for the 2012 season.

History

2009

Rosters

2011  

Ages as of 1 January 2011.

2006

Ages as of 1 January 2006.

2005

Ages as of 1 January 2005.

Major wins 

2005
Souvenir Magali Pache Lausanne, Karin Thurig
Prologue Tour de l'Aude Cycliste Féminin, Christiane Soeder
Stages 5 & 8 Tour de l'Aude Cycliste Féminin, Karin Thurig
Overall Tour Cycliste féminin, Priska Doppmann
Stage 2, Christiane Soeder
Stage 3, Edwige Pitel
Stage 4, Emma Rickards
Stage 6, Priska Doppmann
Overall Tour Féminin en Limousin, Edwige Pitel
Stage 3b, Edwige Pitel
Chrono des Herbiers, Edwige Pitel
2006
Stage 1 Geelong Tour, Christiane Soeder
Stage 3 Novilon Eurocup Ronde van Drenthe, Joanne Kiesanowski
La Flèche Wallonne, Nicole Cooke
Souvenir Magali Pache Lausanne, Nicole Cooke
Gran Premio Castilla y Leon, Nicole Cooke
Stage 4 Tour de l'Aude Cycliste Féminin, Joanne Kiesanowski
Stage 6 Tour de l'Aude Cycliste Féminin, Priska Doppmann
Overall Tour Cycliste féminin, Nicole Cooke
Stages 1 & 4, Nicole Cooke
Stage 2b, Joanne Kiesanowski
Stage 3, Emma Richards
Overall International Thüringen Rundfahrt der Frauen, Nicole Cooke
Prologue, Christiane Soeder
Stages 2, 4, 5 & 6 Nicole Cooke
Chrono des Herbiers, Priska Doppmann
Chrono Champenois – Trophée Européen, Karin Thurig
2006 UCI Women's Road World Cup, Team standings champion
2007
Overall Geelong Tour, Nicole Cooke
Geelong – Women's World Cup, Nicole Cooke
GP Costa Etrusca, Nicole Cooke
Trofeo Alfredo Binda, Nicole Cooke
Ronde van Vlaanderen voor Vrouwen, Nicole Cooke
Prologue Tour de l'Aude Cycliste Féminin, Christiane Soeder
Overall Tour Cycliste féminin, Nicole Cooke
Stage 1, Karin Thurig
Stage 2, 3a & 5 Priska Doppmann
Stage 3b, Nicole Cooke
Stage 4, Tanja Slater
Stage 5a International Thüringen Rundfahrt der Frauen, Christiane Soeder
Albstadt-Frauen-Etappenrennen, Nicole Cooke
Memorial Davide Fardelli – Cronometro Individuale, Karin Thurig
Chrono Champenois – Trophée Européen, Karin Thurig
2007 UCI Women's Road World Cup, Team standings champion
2008
Overall Geelong Tour, Christiane Soeder 
Stage 1, Christiane Soeder
Overall Tour of New Zealand, Kristin Armstrong
Stages 3 & 5, Kristin Armstrong
Giro dei Comuni Ribardella-Montescudaio, Kristin Armstrong
Novilon Eurocup Ronde van Drenthe, Kristin Armstrong
Souvenir Magali Pache Lausanne, Christiane Soeder
Stages 1 & 3 Mt Hood Cycling Classic, Joanne Kiesanowski
Overall Tour Cycliste féminin, Christiane Soeder
Stage 5, Karin Thurig
Stage 7, Christiane Soeder
Team classification, Tour de Feminin – Krasna Lipa (2.2W)
Stage 5 Tour de Feminin – Krasna Lipa, Priska Doppmann
Stage 2 Tour Féminin de Bretagne, Joanne Kiesanowski
Stage 2 International Thüringen Rundfahrt der Frauen, Priska Doppmann
Stage 5 International Thüringen Rundfahrt der Frauen, Karin Thurig
Olympic TimeTrial Championship, Kristin Armstrong
Memorial Davide Fardelli, Karin Thurig
Chrono Champenois – Trophée Européen, Karin Thurig
General classification Cascade Cycling Classic, Kristin Armstrong
Points classification Cascade Cycling Classic, Kristin Armstrong
2009
Overall Ladies Tour of Qatar, Kirsten Wild
GP Costa Etrusca, Emma Pooley
Giro dei Comuni Ribardella-Montescudaio, Sarah Düster
Grand Prix de Dottignies, Sarah Düster
Omloop van Borsele, Kirsten Wild
GP Stad Roeselare, Kirsten Wild
Grand Prix de Suisse, Chrisitane Soeder
Berner-Rundfahrt- WE, Kristin Armstrong
Overall Tour de l'Aude Cycliste Féminin, Claudia Häusler
Stage 5, Kristin Armstrong
La Coupe du Monde Cycliste Féminine de Montréal, Emma Pooley
Overall Tour du Grand Montréal, Kirsten Wild
Stages 1, 2 & 4, Kirsten Wild
Stage 3, Regina Bruins
Overall Tour Cycliste féminin, Emma Pooley
Stages 1 & 3, Emma Pooley
Stage 2, Christiane Soeder
Overall Giro d'Italia Femminile, Claudia Häusler
Points classification, Claudia Häusler
Prologue & Stage 9, Kirsten Wild
Stage 7, Claudia Häusler
Stage 4 International Thüringen Rundfahrt der Frauen, Christiane Soeder
GP de Plouay, Emma Pooley
Stages 1, 3 & 4 BrainWash Ladies Tour, Kirsten Wild
Rund um die Nürnberger Altstadt – WE, Kirsten Wild
Overall Tour Cycliste Féminin International Ardèche, Kristin Armstrong
Stages 1 & 2, Christiane Soeder
Stage 3, Kristin Armstrong
2009 UCI Women's Road World Cup, Team standings champion
2010
Overall Ladies Tour of Qatar, Kirsten Wild
Stage 3, Kirsten Wild
Grand Prix de Dottignies, Kirsten Wild
Ronde van Gelderland, Kirsten Wild
La Flèche Wallonne – WE, Emma Pooley
Omloop van Borsele, Kirsten Wild
GP Stad Roeselare, Kirsten Wild
Grand Prix de Suisse, Emma Pooley
Grand Prix Elsy Jacobs, Emma Pooley
Stage 2 Tour of Chongming Island, Kirsten Wild
Overall Tour de l'Aude Cycliste Féminin, Emma Pooley
Prologue, Regina Bruins
Stage 1, Lizzie Armitstead
Stage 7, Emma Pooley
Overall Rabobank Ster Zeeuwsche Eilanden, Kirsten Wild
Stages 1 & 2, Kirsten Wild
G.P. Ciudad de Valladolid, Charlotte Becker
Therme kasseienomloop, Regina Bruins
Iurreta-Emakumeen Bira, Claudia Häusler
Overall Giro del Trentino Alto Adige-Südtirol, Emma Pooley
Stage 1, Emma Pooley
Stage 5 International Thüringen Rundfahrt der Frauen, Sarah Düster
Stage 6 International Thüringen Rundfahrt der Frauen, Iris Slappendel
Open de Suède Vårgårda, Kirsten Wild
Stage 1 Route de France Féminine, Sarah Düster
Stage 7 Route de France Féminine, Lizzie Armistead
GP de Plouay, Emma Pooley
Stages 4 & 5 BrainWash Ladies Tour, Kirsten Wild
Stage 1 Tour Cycliste Féminin International Ardèche, Sharon Laws
Stages 3, 4 & 5, Tour Cycliste Féminin International Ardèche, Lizzie Armitstead
Stage 6 Tour Cycliste Féminin International Ardèche, Carla Ryan
Giro della Toscana Femminile – Memorial Michela Fanini, Kirsten Wild
2011
Trofeo Alfredo Binda, Emma Pooley
Stage 3a Iurreta-Emakumeen Bira, Emma Pooley
Stage 1 Tour of Chongming Island, Lizzie Armitstead
Stage 8 Giro d'Italia Femminile, Emma Pooley
Stage 4 International Thüringen Rundfahrt der Frauen, Emma Pooley
Stage 6 International Thüringen Rundfahrt der Frauen, Lizzie Armitstead
Stage 3 Tour Cycliste Féminin International Ardèche, Emma Pooley

National, continental and world champions

2005
 Swiss Roacd Race Championship, Sereina Traschel
 French Time Trial Championship, Edwige Pitel
 Austrian Time Trial Championship, Christiane Soeder
 World TimeTrial Championship, Karin Thurig
2006
 New Zealand Track Championship (Points race), Joanne Kiesanowski
  British Road Race Championship, Nicole Cooke
 Austrian Road Race Championship, Christiane Soeder
 Austrian Time Trial Championship, Christiane Soeder
2007
 New Zealand Track Championship (Points race), Joanne Kiesanowski
 Austrian Criterium Championship, Christiane Soeder
 Austrian Time Trial Championship, Christiane Soeder
 Swiss Road Race Championship, Sereina Traschel
  British Road Race Championship, Nicole Cooke
 Swiss Hill Climb Championship, Priska Doppmann
2008
 Austrian Criterium Championship, Christiane Soeder
 Swiss Time Trial Championship, Karin Thürig
2009
 Australian Time Trial Championship, Carla Ryan
 Australian Road Race Championship, Carla Ryan
 Austrian Road Race Championships, Christiane Soeder
 Dutch Time Trial Championship, Regina Bruins
  British Time Trial Championship, Emma Pooley
 Austrian Time Trial Championship, Christiane Soeder
 World Time Trial Championship, Kristin Armstrong
2010
 German Road Race Championship, Charlotte Becker
 Swiss Road Race Championship, Emilie Aubry
  British Road Race Championship, Emma Pooley
  British Time Trial Championship, Emma Pooley
 German Track Championship (Individual pursuit), Charlotte Becker
 World Time Trial Championship, Emma Pooley
 Dutch Track Championship (Points race), Kirsten Wild
2011
  British Track Championship (Points race), Lizzie Armitstead
 Australian Road Race Championships, Alexis Rhodes
 Italian Road Race Championship, Noemi Cantele
  British Road Race Championship, Lizzie Armitstead
 Italian Time Trial Championship, Noemi Cantele
  British Track Championship (Scratch race), Lizzie Armitstead

References

UCI Women's Teams
Cycling teams based in Switzerland
Cycling teams established in 2005
Cycling teams disestablished in 2011
Cervélo TestTeam